Charles Hastings Collette (1816–1901) was a British 19th-century solicitor and writer of Protestant popular controversialist apologetics. He was the father of actor Charles Henry Collette and the organizer of the Joseph Mendham library.  As a volunteer in the First Middlesex Artillery, he compiled a handbook for drill instruction.

His Novelties of Romanism, developed from a sermon, was translated into Spanish and, from Spanish, into Portuguese (under the translated name of Carlos Hastings Collette) and remains in print to this day.

References

Bibliography
 .
 .
 .
 .

1816 births
1901 deaths
British religious writers
19th-century British lawyers
19th-century British writers
19th-century British male writers
Protestant writers